Muḥammad bin Ibrāhīm Ibn al-Wazīr (d. 840/1436) was a Yemeni Shi'ite Zaydiyyah Hadith scholar. He wrote a rebuttal of the Shi'ite Jafari school and then penned a massive defense of the Prophet's Sunna as understood through the Sunni prism of Prophetic hadith. Amongst his works is a commentary on Ibn al-Salah's Muqaddima, titled Tanqih al-anzar.

Works
Ibn al-Wazir authored many works, including:
 Tanqih al-anzar.
 al-ʿAwasim wa al-Qawassim fi al-Dhab ʿan Sunnat ʾAbi Qasim. 
 al-Burhan al-Qatiʿ fi ʾItbat al-Saniʿ wa Jamiʿ ma Jaʾat bihi al-Charaʾiʿ.
 Ithar al-Ḥaqq ʿala al-Khalq.
 al-Rawd al-Bassim fi al-Dhab ʿan Sunnat ʾAbi Qasim.
In addition to other non-published manuscripts.

See also
List of Islamic scholars

References

Hadith scholars
15th-century Muslim scholars of Islam
Sunni Muslim scholars of Islam
Critics of Shia Islam
1436 deaths
1373 births